Clemens Jabloner (born 28 November 1948) is an Austrian jurist who served as Vice-Chancellor of Austria and Minister of Justice in the Bierlein government from 2019 to 2020. He previously served as president of the Supreme Administrative Court of Austria from 1993 to 2013 and was a professor of jurisprudence at the University of Vienna.

References 

1948 births
Living people
Government ministers of Austria
Vice-Chancellors of Austria
Justice ministers of Austria
21st-century Austrian politicians